The Gohil or Gohel and Goheel is a Clan (Gotra) of the Koli caste found in the Indian state of the Gujarat and Daman and Diu.

Notable people
Gigabhai Gohil, Member of Parliament from Bhavnagar Lok Sabha constituency

References

External links 
Gazetteer of the Bombay Presidency: Káthiáwar, University of California

Koli clans